Venus is a Canadian comedy-drama film, directed by Eisha Marjara and released in 2017. The film stars Debargo Sanyal as Sid, an Indo-Canadian who is just beginning to come out as a transgender woman when she unexpectedly discovers that she has a teenage son (Jamie Mayers) with a former high school girlfriend.

The cast also includes Zena Darawalla, Pierre-Yves Cardinal, Amber Goldfarb and Gordon Warnecke.

The film premiered on the film festival circuit in 2017, before going into general theatrical release in 2018.

Awards and nominations 
The film received a Canadian Screen Award nomination for Best Makeup (Tammy-Lou Pate) at the 7th Canadian Screen Awards in 2019.

References

External links
 

2017 films
2017 LGBT-related films
2017 comedy-drama films
Canadian comedy-drama films
Canadian LGBT-related films
LGBT-related comedy-drama films
Films about trans women
English-language Canadian films
Films directed by Eisha Marjara
2010s English-language films
2010s Canadian films